Borsonellopsis is a genus of sea snails, marine gastropod mollusks in the family Borsoniidae.

Description
In contrast with Borsonella, the shells in this genus are larger in size, have a weakly plicate columella and have a vestigial operculum with an apical nucleus.

Species
McLean included the following species within the genus Borsonellopsis but the database WoRMS still considers them as belonging to Borsonella.
 Borsonella callicesta (Dall, 1902)
 Borsonella diegensis (Dall, 1908)
 Borsonella erosina (Dall, 1908)

References

 McLean, J.H. (1971) A revised classification of the family Turridae, with the proposal of new subfamilies, genera, and subgenera from the Eastern Pacific. The Veliger, 14, 114–130

External links
  Bouchet P., Kantor Yu.I., Sysoev A. & Puillandre N. (2011) A new operational classification of the Conoidea. Journal of Molluscan Studies 77: 273-308.

Borsoniidae